Roy High School is a 6A secondary school founded in 1965 that serves the residents of Roy, Utah, United States.

History
Prior to the establishment of Hill Air Force Base in 1940, the city of Roy had only one school that housed students of all ages. In 1943, that schoolhouse reached capacity and high school students were bused across Ogden to the north end of Washington Boulevard, a procedure practiced until 1965 when Roy High School was built. It became Weber County's largest high school at the time, and was later rated as one of the ten best in the nation. For the 2016–17 school year, Gina Butters, the former principal was promoted to the Board of Secondary Education, and Kirt Swalberg was named the new principal.

In 2008, Roy High launched a new website for viewing full length boys' basketball games.

In November 2018, the Utah High School Activities Association changed Roy High's sports classification to 6A, the highest in the state.

Notable alumni
 Luann "L'Wren Scott" Bambrough - model; costume and fashion designer (Class of 1982)
 Sabra Johnson - winner of FOX TV's reality competition TV show So You Think You Can Dance in 2007 (Class of 2005)
 Jim McMahon - former football player; two-time Super Bowl Champion (Class of 1977)
 Randal Quarles - Under Secretary of the Treasury for Domestic Finance 2005–2006, Current candidate for Federal Reserve Chairmanship (Class of 1975)
 Billy Schuffenhauer - two-time Olympic medalist and gold medalist in the 1992 Junior Olympics (Class of 1991)

State championships 

  Football 1981
  Boys' track 1991
  Girls' soccer 1997
  Softball 1998
  Boys' soccer 2003
  Drill 2007
  Softball 2009 
  Softball 2011
  Softball 2012

References

External links
 Roy High School
 Weber County School District

Public high schools in Utah
Educational institutions established in 1965
Schools in Weber County, Utah
1965 establishments in Utah